The TitansRX International Series (formerly known as Red Bull Global Rallycross or Global Rallycross) is a group of rallycross series, currently organised by racing driver Max Pucher and businessman Chip Pankow. The initial series was series run in North America in 2011 and ran for seven seasons until the series folded in 2018, where the series was replaced by the Americas Rallycross Championship. In late-2018, Max Pucher revived the brand and set up the series Titans-RX Europe, starting in 2019 and the International Series planned to start in 2021. The 2020 campaign was scaled back to a one-make single race in March before resuming in 2021.

History

Following Rallycross's inclusion in the 2010 Los Angeles X Games, three demonstration events were held in late 2010 at the New Jersey Motorsports Park, and Global Rallycross Management organized their first championship season of five events in 2011. Tanner Foust won the inaugural championship title in 2011. He retained the title again in 2012.

In addition to promoting the series, Global Rallycross Management managed invitations and competition for X Games Rallycross contests.

In 2013, the series held races outside the United States for the first time. Later in the season, it introduced the Lites division, a developmental series. Making its debut at New Hampshire Motor Speedway, Joni Wiman was the inaugural champion after winning all six races.

On October 28, 2016, the series announced the formation of an electric racing division.

In 2018 Global Rallycross in its initial form ceased operations, only to be revived later that same year and relocating to Europe, with a plan to reintroduce the championship to North America in 2020. In February 2019, the series renamed itself to Titans-RX, removing "Global" from its name to avoid conflict with FIA sanctioned competitions.

Format (pre-2019)

Qualifying
Qualifying was conducted over the course of one hour. The field was broken up into small groups that took to the track in 10-minute sessions. Seeding for heat races was determined by a driver's qualifying lap time.

Heats
A race weekend consisted of one or two rounds of heats that count for championship points, as well as a semifinal. The heats always consisted of three sessions of four or five cars each, while the semifinals consisted of two sessions of six or more cars each. In the case of an event with only one round of heats, such as a doubleheader race, points were awarded in the semifinal, but not otherwise.

The top three finishers in the semifinals transferred into the main event, giving their teams time to work on their cars while others continue to compete. All drivers who do not make it into the main event via the semifinals would compete in the last chance qualifier for the final four remaining qualifying spots. Ten cars then compete in the main event.

Start
Races began with a standing start, where drivers are given 30- and 10-second intervals before the green. During that time they must activate launch systems, including an anti-lag system, before starting the race. The fastest driver in the previous session was given the inside lane to the first corner.

Joker lap
Each course was equipped with two routes: the main route, and the joker lap route, which each driver must only take once per race. The GRC joker lap route typically shortened the length of the track significantly (while in the FIA World Rallycross Championship the JL detour is longer than the main route, to slow the cars down for a minimum of two seconds), so when a driver takes the joker lap can affect their race strategy. Depending on the venue, the joker lap route may have additional obstacles which significantly slow the cars thus making the main route faster. In mid season 2015, GRC made some changes to the joker lap, where drivers were not allowed to take the joker lap on the first lap.

Penalty box
The penalty box was a new addition to series for the 2013 season, and was designed to deal with on-track infractions without having to red flag or restart the race. In event of a jump start or unsportsmanlike driving, the penalised driver would pull into a 50-metre lane off track, where they would be held until a track official releases them. The penalty box was first used at the first event at X Games Brazil, when Nelson Piquet Jr. jump-started at the beginning of Heat 2.

Championship points
As of 2014, championship points were awarded only to drivers who had committed to running at least half of the season. Under that point system, one-off drivers were skipped over when points were awarded; for example, if the race winner was not eligible to earn points, the event runner-up would earn first place points. Points were awarded at the conclusion of the event to eligible finishers as follows:

In addition, points were awarded in all rounds of heats and semifinals. First place earned five points, second place earned four points, and so on through fifth place and below, which earn one point. Only drivers who were disqualified from a heat or fail to pull to the starting grid did not receive points for their heats. On race weekends with three rounds of heats, the third round solely determined starting spots in the main event and did not award points.

At the end of the season, the driver to score the most points was crowned Global Rallycross champion. The top two cars per manufacturer also scored points in the manufacturer's championship.

Format (2019 onwards)
The new format will first be used in the European championship which will consist of 10 one-day events driven on 5 closed circuits with mixed surface (mostly asphalt and gravel), with an 11th event acting as a series final. Each event consists of:

 3 Qualifying heats. In each of the 3 series there will smaller races containing 3 to 5 cars called groups, and the driver with the fastest overall race time after 5 laps is declared the qualifying winner of Q1, Q2 and/or Q3. Drivers earn 'intermediate points' based on their positions. After the 3 qualifying series, the points are added up and the 12 drivers with the most points in the 'intermediate standings' move into the next round.

 2 Semi-Finals. 6 cars race in each of both semi-finals, which are run over 6 laps. The top 3 drivers in each semi-final move into the final round.

 Final. Like the semi-finals, this race is contested by 6 cars but over 7 laps. The winner of the final is deemed to be the event winner and receives 25 championship points

Unlike other rallycross championships, Joker Laps are not used in all vehicle classes and for the Titans-RX class, has instead modified the intermediate point system to encourage overtaking on the main part of the track.

Points system
 

Intermediate points are split into two categories, Race Time points (for race time, regardless of group) and Race Position points (for position in each group), which are scored as follows:

Championship points are scored as follows:

A red background denotes drivers who did not advance from the round

Champions

Supercar Class

Titans-RX Class

See also
FIA World Rallycross Championship
Pantera RX6

References

External links
 

GRC Rallycross
Rallycross racing series